Joseph McFadden may refer to:

Joe McFadden (born 1975), Scottish actor
Joseph J. McFadden (1916–1991), American judge
Joseph P. McFadden (1947–2013), American bishop